Belarus participated in the Junior Eurovision Song Contest 2013 in Kyiv, Ukraine. The Belarusian entry was selected through a national final, organised by Belarusian broadcaster National State Television and Radio Company of the Republic of Belarus (BTRC). The final was held on 4 October 2013. Ilya Volkov and his song "Poy so mnoy" won the national final, scoring 18 points.

Before Junior Eurovision

National final 
On 19 March 2013, BTRC announced that a national final would be held to select Belarus' entry for the Junior Eurovision Song Contest 2013.

Competing entries 
A submission period for interested artists was opened and lasted until 10 June 2013. After the deadline passed, 53 applications were received by the broadcaster. A professional jury selected ten artists and songs from the applicants to proceed to the televised national final.

Final 
The final took place on 4 October 2013 at the Studio 600 in Minsk, hosted by Teo, Belarus' 2014 Eurovision contestant, and Alyona Lanskaya, Belarus' 2013 Eurovision contestant. The winner was determined by a 50/50 combination of votes from a jury made up of music professionals and a public vote.

The members of the jury were Irina Dorofeeva, Elena Atrashkevich, Lyudmila Borodina, Gennadiy Markevich, Nadezhda Vasilchenko, Olga Vorobyova, Tatyana Yakusheva, Tatyana Parhamovich and Eduard Zaritsky.

At Junior Eurovision 

During the allocation draw on 25 November 2013, Belarus was drawn to perform 7th, following Ukraine and preceding Moldova. Belarus placed 3rd, scoring 108 points.

Ilya Volkov were joined on stage by dance group "Maxi Briz": Leyla Tabatadze, Iolanta Verbitskaya, Milena Volskaya, Katya Artemyeva, Dinara Geydarova.

In Belarus, show were broadcast on BTRC with commentary by Anatoliy Lipetskiy. The Belarusian spokesperson revealing the result of the Belarusian vote was Sasha Tkach.

Voting

Notes

References

Junior Eurovision Song Contest
Belarus
2013